The posterior chain is a group of muscles on the posterior of the body. Examples of these muscles include the hamstrings, the gluteus maximus, erector spinae muscle group, trapezius, and posterior deltoids.

Exercises 

The primary exercises for developing the posterior chain are the Olympic lifts, squats, good-mornings, bent-over rows, deadlifts, pull-ups and hyperextensions. The common denominator among many of these movements is a focus on hip extension, excluding bent-over rows and pull ups. Working on hamstrings is also important.

References

Muscular system